OMGPop, stylized as OMGPOP and formerly known as i'minlikewithyou or iilwy, was an independent flash game studio. In 2013, it was purchased by Zynga Inc.

History
OMGPop was based in SoHo, in New York City. The company received seed funding from Y Combinator during its early days as a startup.

The website was listed on Time magazine's 50 Best Websites of 2009.

On 21 March 2012, Zynga announced that it would acquire OMGPop for $180 million, saying "It is our mission to provide consumers with fun, free games. We believe OMGPop will help us fulfill our promise."

Mark Pincus, CEO of Zynga, announced in an official blog post on 3 June 2013 that the company would be laying off 18% of its employees in order to restructure the company and cut back on finances. Many former OMGPop employees were laid off, and the New York office was one of the three that Zynga shut down. While this had been reported as the closure of OMGPop, the omgpop.com website remained active. However, in a statement issued by parent company Zynga in July 2013, it was announced that the site would close on 30 September 2013, with four games – Cupcake Corner, Gem Rush, Pool World Champ and Snoops – being phased out on 29 August 2013.

 Here is their 'YouTube' Channel :
https://youtube.com/user/omgpop

Games
OMGPop's game selection included standard board, card, and sports video games, clones of more well known video games, and special versions of licensed games such as Atari's Missile Command.

OMGPop's most popular game was their Pictionary-like game entitled Draw Something. On 16 March 2012 it was reported that it was the most played game on Facebook registering 10.8 million daily active users, compared to Zynga's Words with Friends with 8.6 million daily active users.

On 4 April 2012 OMGPop reported that their hit game Draw Something had surpassed over 50 million downloads and that since the game's launch, over 6 billion drawings had been shared between friends.

List of games

 9 Ball Pool
 Aim Really Good
 Aim for the Nuts
 Balloono
 Balloono Classic
 Ballracer
 Blockles
 Booya!
 Checkers
 Coin Party
 Cupcake Corner
 Defuse
 Dinglepop
 Draw My Thing
 Draw Something
 Fireworks
 Fleet Fighter
 Fourplay
 Gemmers
 Hamster Battle
 HamsterJet
 Hangman
 Hit Machine
 Hover Kart Battle
 Hover Kart Racing
 Hover Kart Party
 Jigsawce
 Letterblox
 Lottery
 Omgfife
 Poll Positions Lite
 Pool
 Puppy World
 Putt My Penguin
 Quiz World
 Rock Paper Scissors
 Sky Pigs
 Solitaire
 Spin The Bottle
 Swapples
 Tonk
 Tracism
 Trivia
 Typow!
 Typow Remix
 Pets
 Unscramble

References

Browser-based game websites
Internet properties established in 2006
Y Combinator companies
2012 mergers and acquisitions
Zynga